Said Bey is a Moroccan actor and humorist.

Filmography 
Jesus (1999)
 The Man Who Sold the World (2009)
 Femmes en miroires (2011)
 Road To Kabul (2011)
Son of God (2014)
 Urgent (2018)

External links

References 

Moroccan male television actors
Moroccan male film actors
Moroccan comedians
Living people
1970 births